Josani may refer to several villages in Romania:

 Josani, a village in Căbești Commune, Bihor County
 Josani, a village in Măgești Commune, Bihor County
 Josani, a village in Pestișu Mic Commune, Hunedoara County